Wermad, Wiomad, Weomad, or Wiemad ( or ) (died 791) was the Bishop of Trier from 757/8 until his death. He accompanied Charlemagne on his conquest of Italy in 774 and against the Avars. He was granted full autonomy over his diocese and the properties of the church of Trier received immunity from the jurisdiction of the local counts.

Sources
Bauer, Thomas (1998). "Weomad." Biographisch-Bibliographisches Kirchenlexikon, XIII, 767–772.

791 deaths
Roman Catholic bishops of Trier
Year of birth unknown